Jung-soon, also spelled Jong-sun or Jeong-soon, is a Korean feminine given name. Its meaning depends on the hanja used to write each syllable of the name. There are 75 hanja with the reading "jung" and 31 hanja with the reading "soon" on the South Korean government's official list of hanja which may be registered for use in given names. According to South Korean government data, Jung-soon was the ninth-most popular name for newborn girls in Korea in 1945. It was the only one of the top ten names for girls not ending in "ja".

People with this name include:
Yang Jeong-soon, South Korean tennis player, bronze medalist in Tennis at the 1966 Asian Games
Song Jong-sun (born 1981), North Korean football defender

See also
List of Korean given names

References

Korean feminine given names